The Utah Division of Public Utilities regulates the energy, telecommunications, gas and water companies located in Utah.

See also

 Public Utilities Commission

External links
 Utah Division of Public Utilities Website

Utah
State agencies of Utah
Public Service